Aghostinho Fernandes (born Quepem, Goa 2 July 1932, died Portugal 29 June 2015) was the author of one of Goa's key post-colonial novels, Bodki, which has attracted significant critical attention.

Biography

Fernandes studied at the Liceu Nacional Afonso de Albuquerque before matriculating at the Escola Médica Cirúrgica de Goa; he considered working in Goa but won a place at the Universidade de Coimbra to develop his medical training. His first job (1960–62) was directing the campaign against sleeping sickness in Angola. He returned to Portugal and from 1974 to 1982 was a cardiologist at Centro Hospitalar das Caldas da Rainha, as well as working in other hospitals such as the Hospital de Santa Maria, Lisbon. He was a Member of Sociedade Portuguesa de Cardiologia and the European Society of Cardiology. He was the brother of John Claro Fernandes, who became a noted Tiatr writer and director.

Works

Fernandes's most famous work is the Portuguese-language novel Bodki (1962). In the words of Everton V. Machado,

The constant clash between modern convictions of the elite raised in a Christian environment and the popular beliefs among the lower social strata of Goa must be re-emphasized within the set of Indo-Portuguese themes, as is very clearly illustrated in the novel Bodki ... In it, a young physician from the capital finds himself confronting the superstitions of the people of a village, especially those who marginalize the bodki, a Hindu widow, considered to be responsible for all the bad happenings that took place there.

Fernandes was involved in journalism in Goa, Angola and Portugal; wrote a number of unpublished plays in Konkani; and the poetry collection Os Meus proprios pedaços. He also wrote the novel Por além do além, published in 2007.

References

1932 births
2015 deaths
20th-century Indian poets
20th-century Indian novelists
Indian male poets
Indian male novelists
Novelists from Goa
Indian Roman Catholics
Portuguese-language writers
Konkani people
Konkani-language writers
Goan Catholics
20th-century Indian male writers